Dêqên Tibetan Autonomous Prefecture, also known as Diqing Tibetan Autonomous Prefecture is an autonomous prefecture in Northwestern Yunnan Province, China. Its capital, which is also the largest city in the prefecture, is Shangri-La City.

This prefecture of Yunnan Province is bordered on the northeast by Sichuan Province and on the northwest by the Tibet Autonomous Region (TAR). Southwest and southeast of Dêqên Prefecture are other parts of Yunnan Province: Nujiang Lisu Autonomous Prefecture and Lijiang respectively.

There are three county-level divisions in this prefecture: Shangri-La City, Dêqên County and Weixi Lisu Autonomous County and they all used to be under the administration of Lijiang (located southeast of this prefecture). This autonomous prefecture was established in 1957 and named Diqing by its first governor. The name of this Tibetan autonomous prefecture (TAP) is also spelled Dechen, Deqing or Dêqên.

Transport

Air
Diqing Shangri-La Airport, also known simply as Diqing Airport, is one of the biggest airports in the northwest of the Yunnan Province. There are flights to Lhasa, Chengdu, Beijing (via Kunming), Shanghai Pudong, Shenzhen (via Guiyang), Guangzhou, Kunming and Xishuangbanna.

Road
Highways are the main means of transportation to reach Dêqên Prefecture. The major highway in this prefecture is China National Highway 214 (a Yunnan-Tibet-Qinghai highway abbreviated "G214").

There are also direct bus routes to Kunming, Lijiang and Panzhihua (Sichuan).

Demography
Ethnic groups in Dêqên, 2000 census

Subdivisions

Dêqên is divided into three counties, among which one is Autonomous county:

History
This prefecture is in the southern part of a historical region called Kham, which belonged to the Tibetan Empire many centuries ago. After the decline of that empire in the 9th century, peripheral areas like southern Kham remained part of Tibet more in an ethnographical than a political sense. As a practical matter, by the mid-1700s, the Tibetan Government had mostly lost control of Kham to Manchu (Qing) China and that situation lasted until the end of the Manchu Dynasty in 1912.

Southern Kham along with other parts of Yunnan were ruled by the Yunnan clique from 1915 until 1927.  Then it was controlled by Governor and warlord Long (Lung) Yun until near the end of the Chinese Civil War, when Du Yuming removed him under the order of Chiang Kai-shek.

There are three counties in this prefecture: Shangri-La (formerly Zhongdian), Dêqên County and Weixi Lisu Autonomous County (formerly Weixi) and they all were under the administration of Lijiang. The Autonomous Prefecture was established in 1957 and named "Diqing" by its first governor.

During the remainder of the 20th century, the prefecture's capital was called Zhongdian but was renamed on December 17, 2001 as Shangri-La City (other spellings: Semkyi'nyida, Xianggelila or Xamgyi'nyilha) after the fictional land of Shangri-La in the 1933 James Hilton novel Lost Horizon, with an eye toward promoting tourism in the area.

On January 11, 2014, there was a major fire in the 1,000-year-old Dukezong Tibetan neighborhood of the capital city Shangri-La, causing much damage and hardship.

References

External links

Official Website (in Chinese)
Yunnan-Diqing via chinadiscover.net.

 
Tibetan autonomous prefectures